Manasses of Soissons (died 1 March 1108), son of William Busac, Count of Soissons, and his wife Adelaide.  Bishop of Cambrai, Bishop of Soissons.

Following the death of Gerard II, Bishop of Cambrai, the canons of the church first appointed the provost Mascelin to the post, and then the archdeacon Walchero, against the wishes of the residents of the town.  In 1095, Pope Urban II settled the issue and appointed Manasses as bishop, and expelled Walchero.  In 1103, Manasses was appointed as Bishop of Soissons by the pope.

Manasses was succeeded as Bishop of Cambrai by Odo of Tournai in 1103, and as Bishop of Soissons by Liziard de Crépy upon his death in 1108.

Sources 

Waters, Edmund C., The Counts of Eu, Sometime Lords of the Honour of Tickhill, The Yorkshire Archaeological and Topographical Journal, No. 9, 1886

Bishops of Cambrai
Bishops of Soissons